

In Music
Teenager of the Year (album) a 1994 studio album by Frank Black
"Teenager of the Year (song)" a 2000 song by Lo-Tel

See also
 Teenager (disambiguation)